Excision may refer to:

 In surgery, the partial removal of an organ, tissue, bone or tumor from a body
 Type II female genital mutilation
 A term used by the Australian government as part of its definition of the Australian migration zone
 Excision theorem in algebraic topology, a branch of mathematics
 Excise, taxes charged on the purchase of goods or services
 Excision (musician), a Canadian dubstep producer from British Columbia.
 Excision (film), a 2012 American horror film